The women's javelin throw event at the 2015 African Games was held on 15 September.

Results

References

Javelin
2015 in women's athletics